The Ministry of Labor and Social Security of Chile is an entity of the state of Chile.

Its current minister is Jeannette Jara.

List of representatives

2010−present

References

External Link
 

Government ministries of Chile